Scar Bluffs is a three black, rectangular, steep-sided rock outcrops  south of Cape Hudson, Mawson Peninsula. Photographed by U.S. Navy Operation Highjump, 1946–47, the Soviet Antarctic Expedition, 1958, and ANARE (Australian National Antarctic Research Expeditions), 1959. Named by Antarctic Names Committee of Australia (ANCA) after the Special Committee on Antarctic Research (SCAR) of the International Council of Scientific Unions.

Cliffs of Antarctica
Landforms of George V Land